Cannabis in The Gambia is illegal. 

It is known locally as yamba or tie and is the most used illegal drug in the country.

References

Gambia
Drugs in the Gambia